Anna Wang was a Catholic lay girl who was martyred during the Boxer Rebellion. She was declared a saint by John Paul II. She is one of the Martyrs of China.

Early life 
Anna was born in 1886 at Machiazhuang, Hebei, China. She was born in a poor Christian family. She lost her mother when she was five years old. She was made strong in religion by receiving religious education from the nun Lucy Wang. She was forced to get married by her family at the age of eleven but she fought against it and didn't get married. She grew up as a strong Catholic believer.

Martyrdom 
On 21 July 1900, a group of armed Boxer Rebellion activists, came to her village and dragged every Christian to kill them and burnt down the church. Activists asked Christians to renounce Christianity or choose to die. Anna, along with few more refused to renounce Christianity and was beheaded along with other Christians in her village at the age of fourteen. Her body was dumped along with others in a mass grave. Her body was exhumed and given proper burial on 6 November 1901.

Canonisation 
She was venerated by Pope Pius XII on 22 February 1955 and beatified on 17 April. She was canonized and declared a saint by Pope John Paul II along with other Martyrs of China on 1 October 2000.

References 

1886 births
1900 deaths
19th-century executions by China
20th-century Roman Catholic martyrs
20th-century venerated Christians
Catholic martyrs
Christian child saints
Chinese children
Chinese Roman Catholic saints
Executed children
Executed Qing dynasty people
People executed by the Qing dynasty